The 2005 Portland Timbers season was the 5th season for the Portland Timbers—the 3rd incarnation of a club to bear the Timbers name—of the now-defunct USL First Division, the second-tier league of the United States and Canada at the time.

Preseason

Regular season

April

May

June

July

August

September

Postseason

Competitions

USL First Division

Standings

Results summary

Results by round

USL-1 Playoffs

Playoff bracket

First round

U.S. Open Cup

Cup bracket

Third round

Fourth round

Cascadia Cup

Club 
<div style="float:left; width:47%;">

Coaching staff

Top scorers
Players with 1 goal or more included only.

Disciplinary record 
Players with 1 card or more included only.

Goalkeeper stats 
All goalkeepers included.

Player movement

Transfers in

Loans in

Transfers out

Loans out

Unsigned draft picks

Notes
A.  It was announced on March 30 that Portland Baseball Investment Group, headed by Abe Alizadeh, had agreed to buy the Timbers and the Portland Beavers baseball club from the Pacific Coast League. The Timbers referred to Alizadeh as the Majority Owner in press releases throughout the 2005 season. However, the sale was not officially completed until June 16, 2006.

References

2005
American soccer clubs 2005 season
2005 United Soccer Leagues
2005 in sports in Oregon
2005 in Portland, Oregon